Matthys Johannes 'Thys' Lourens (born 15 May 1943) is a former South African rugby union Rugby player.

Playing career
Lourens played 168 first class provincial matches for Northern Transvaal, 91 of which were in the Currie Cup competition. He captained the team on 84 occasions and scored 63 tries.

Only Louis Moolman (171), Naas Botha (179) and Burger Geldenhuys (184) have played in more matches than Lourens. His usual position was as a flanker, where he also played for the national team, the Springboks.

He represented South Africa thrice, the first on 22 June 1968, when he played at flanker in a match against the British & Irish Lions at the Boet Erasmus Stadium in Port Elizabeth, which resulted in a six-all draw. He played in the subsequent test at Newlands in which he scored a try in the 11–6 win. He earned a third cap in the third match of the test series, at Ellis Park, which the Springboks won 19–6.

Test history

See also
List of South Africa national rugby union players – Springbok no. 425

References

External links
Thys Lourens on genslin.us
http://thebulls.co.za/the-team/player-of-the-week/thys-lourens.html

1943 births
Living people
South African rugby union players
South Africa international rugby union players
Rugby union flankers
Rugby union players from KwaZulu-Natal
Blue Bulls players